is a village located in Aomori, Japan. In 2016, Sai was selected as one of The Most Beautiful Villages in Japan.

Geography
Sai occupies the western coastline of Shimokita Peninsula, facing the inlet to Mutsu Bay from the Tsugaru Strait. Much of the village is within the limits of the Shimokita Hantō Quasi-National Park. The mountainous area is home to many indigenous plant and animal species. Wildlife includes Japanese macaque monkeys, kamoshika, tanuki and Asian black bears. Most of the population resides in coastal hamlets. Approximately 90% of the village area is forested; of which 90% is national forest.

Neighbouring municipalities
Aomori Prefecture
Ōma
Mutsu

Climate
The village has a cold oceanic climate characterized by cool short summers and long cold winters with heavy snowfall and strong winds (Köppen climate classification Cfb). The average annual temperature in Sai is 8.9 °C. The average annual rainfall is 1258 mm with September as the wettest month. The temperatures are highest on average in August, at around 21.8 °C, and lowest in January, at around -2.7 °C.

Demographics
Per Japanese census data, the population of Sai has declined over the past 60 years and is now much less than it was a century ago.

History
The area around Sai was inhabited by the Emishi people until the historical period. During the Edo period, it was controlled by the Nambu clan of Morioka Domain and prospered due to its timber industry and as a ferry terminal to Ezo. During the post-Meiji restoration  establishment of the modern municipalities system on 1 April 1889,  Sai Village was proclaimed from the merger of Sai hamlet with neighboring Chōgō hamlet.

Government
Sai has a mayor-council form of government with a directly elected mayor and a unicameral village council of eight members. Sai is part of Shimokita District which, together with the city of Mutsu, contributes three members to the Aomori Prefectural Assembly. In terms of national politics, the city is part of Aomori 1st district of the lower house of the Diet of Japan.

Economy
The economy of Sai is heavily dependent on forestry and commercial fishing. Approximately 90% of the village area is covered by mountains and forest, of which approximately 90% is national forest. Some of the locally caught seafood include sea urchin roe, sea pineapple, sea cucumber, scallops, abalone, konbu and squid. Seasonal tourism is also an important contributor to the local economy.

Education
Sai has one public elementary school, one public middle school and two combined public elementary/middle schools operated by the village government. The village does not have a high school.

Transportation

Railway
The village has no passenger railway service. The nearest train station is Shimokita Station on the JR East Ōminato Line.

Highway

Local attractions
Hotokegaura, a series of naturally-carved cliff rock formations, a National Site of Scenic Beauty
 Shimokita Hanto Quasi-National Park
Tsugaru Straits Cultural Museum Arusas
Yanonemori Hachiman-gu

Local events
 February, Fukuura hamlet stages a kabuki show featuring northern styles of kabuki.
 June: sea urchin roe festival
 July: Hotokegaura festival
 August: Sai Summer Festival and fireworks
 September, Yanonemori Hachiman-gu Matsuri with floats pulled by the locals, during which Kagura is performed and Shinto priests bless the village houses
 November, Sai Culture Festival, during which different variations of festival songs and kagura are performed at the community centre.
 December: Winter illumination

Noted people from Sai
Gōtarō Mikami, physician and Japanese Red Cross supporter during the Russo-Japanese War

References

External links

Official Website 
Sai Tourism Website 

 
Villages in Aomori Prefecture
Populated coastal places in Japan